Macrocalcara undina is a moth of the family Gelechiidae. It was described by Edward Meyrick in 1921. It is found in Zimbabwe.

The wingspan is about 9 mm. The forewings are whitish, thinly speckled with fuscous. The hindwings are whitish grey.

References

Endemic fauna of Zimbabwe
Moths described in 1921
Apatetrinae
Taxa named by Edward Meyrick